SM UB-88 was a German Type UB III submarine or U-boat in the German Imperial Navy during World War I. She was commissioned into the German Imperial Navy on 26 January 1918 as SM UB-88.

Construction

She was built by AG Vulcan of Hamburg and following just under a year of construction, launched at Hamburg on 11 December 1917. UB-88 was commissioned early the next year under the command of Oblt.z.S. Johannes Ries. Like all Type UB III submarines, UB-88 carried 10 torpedoes and was armed with a  deck gun. UB-88 had a displacement of  while surfaced and  when submerged. Her engines enabled her to travel at  when surfaced and  when submerged.

Service history

UB-88 was surrendered to the United States on 26 November 1918 in accordance with the requirements of the Armistice with Germany.  She was refurbished and did an exhibition tour in 1919 from New York, down the East Coast, and up the Mississippi River before passing through the Panama Canal and touring the West Coast as far north as Seattle, Washington.

After having all useful parts and salvage stripped from her, she was sunk as a target on 3 January 1921 in waters off Los Angeles County, California.  The propellers were saved and placed on display in the city of San Pedro but were stolen in 1923 by metal thieves and were never recovered.

The wreck of the vessel was found in July 2003 using publicly available sonar data from the Pacific Seafloor Mapping project. The outer hull has corroded revealing the inner pressure hull. Divers have entered the wreck and found the interior to be almost completely bare. As she was given a special commission to the United States Navy, she is protected by the Sunken Military Craft Act.

Summary of raiding history

References

Notes

Citations

Bibliography

External links 
 DANFS service history from Naval History and Heritage Command website.
 Personal account of Charles Daniel Turner, United States Navy sailor who served aboard UB-88 following surrender, Charles Daniel Turner Collection (AFC/2001/001/27862), Veterans History Project, American Folklife Center, Library of Congress

German Type UB III submarines
World War I submarines of Germany
U-boats commissioned in 1918
1917 ships
Ships built in Hamburg
Ships sunk as targets
Maritime incidents in 1921
Shipwrecks in the Pacific Ocean